The 1965 Washington State Cougars football team was an American football team that represented Washington State University in the Athletic Association of Western Universities (AAWU) during the 1965 NCAA University Division football season. In their second season under head coach Bert Clark, the Cougars compiled a 7–3 record (2–1 in AAWU, third), and outscored their opponents 139 to 103.

The team's statistical leaders included Tom Roth with 1,257 passing yards, Larry Eilmes with 818 rushing yards, and Doug Flansburg with 578 receiving yards.

The Cougars played only three conference games, all against Northwest teams, defeating Oregon State and Oregon. With several close margins in their games, they became known as the "Cardiac Kids."

WSU dropped both rivalry games this season: the Battle of the Palouse at home to Idaho, and the Apple Cup to Washington in Seattle, which eliminated a possible Rose Bowl berth.

Schedule

Roster

NFL and AFL Drafts
This was the final year for separate drafts; both were held on November 27, 1965.

NFL
No Cougars were selected in the 1966 NFL Draft.
 List of Washington State Cougars in the NFL Draft

AFL
One Cougar was selected in the 1966 AFL Draft.

References

External links
 Game program: Villanova vs. WSU at Spokane – October 9, 1965
 Game program: Arizona vs. WSU at Spokane – October 16, 1965
 Game program: Oregon at WSU – November 6, 1965

Washington State
Washington State Cougars football seasons
Washington State Cougars football